Unegetey (Ünegetei) is a rural locality (a selo) in Zaigrayevsky District, Republic of Buryatia, Russia. The population was 1,896 as of 2010. There are 26 streets.

Geography 
Unegetey is located 45 km northeast of Zaigrayevo (the district's administrative centre) by road. Novaya Kurba is the nearest rural locality.

References 

Rural localities in Zaigrayevsky District